Keith Aubrey Jones (born 14 October 1965) is an English retired professional footballer, best remembered for his time as a midfielder in the Football League with Brentford and Charlton Athletic. He also played for Southend United, Chelsea, Reading and was capped by England at youth level. He later became a youth and women's coach.

Club career

Chelsea and Brentford (1983–1991) 
A midfielder, Jones began his career in the Chelsea youth system and made his senior debut in a 3–0 Second Division defeat to Barnsley on 26 March 1983. After one further appearance late in the 1982–83 season, he returned to the youth team and would not appear again until 1984–85, by which time the Blues had been promoted to the First Division. Injuries allowed Jones to break through into the team in September 1984 and he remained a squad player until September 1987, when he dropped down to the Third Division to join Brentford for a tribunal-fixed fee of £40,000. By the beginning of the 1988–89 season, Jones had been appointed club captain and was a part of the Bees teams which reached the sixth round of the 1988–89 FA Cup and the 1991 Third Division play-off semi-finals. His efforts during the 1990–91 season were recognised with his inclusion in the Third Division PFA Team of the Year. In October 1991, a contract dispute with manager Phil Holder saw Jones transfer to Second Division Southend United for a tribunal-fixed fee of £175,000.

Southend United, Charlton Athletic and Reading (1991–2002) 
Despite making over 100 appearances for the club, Jones' four years with Southend United yielded little success on the pitch and he transferred to First Division rivals Charlton Athletic for a £150,000 fee in September 1994. In just under six years at The Valley, he was a part of two teams which won promotion to the Premier League – the first in 1998 after victory in the First Division play-off Final and the second two years later, when the club won the First Division title. Jones was transfer-listed in May 2000 and signed a two-year contract with Second Division club Reading on a free transfer on 1 July 2000. Now the twilight years of his career, Jones was utilised as a squad player and was a part of the team which won automatic promotion to the First Division on the final day of the 2001–02 season. He was released in May 2002 and retired from football.

International career 
Jones was capped by England at schoolboy and youth level.

Coaching career 
Jones began his coaching career in 2000, while still a player. He coached at Chelsea and Tooting & Mitcham United, before moving to the United States in 2006 to coach Atlanta Silverbacks Women. Jones moved to Arizona youth club SC del Sol in 2009.

Career statistics

Honours

As a player 
Charlton Athletic
 Football League First Division: 1999–2000
 Football League First Division play-offs: 1997–98

Reading
 Football League Second Division second-place promotion: 2001–02

Individual
PFA Football League Third Division Team of the Year: 1990–91
 Football League Young Eagle of the Month: December 1984

As a manager 
Atlanta Silverbacks Women
 USL W-League Central Conference: 2007
 USL W-League Atlantic Division: 2007

As an individual 
 USL W-League Coach of the Year: 2007

References

External links

Keith Jones at premierleague.com

1965 births
Living people
Brentford F.C. players
Charlton Athletic F.C. players
Chelsea F.C. players
Chelsea F.C. non-playing staff
English footballers
Footballers from Dulwich
Premier League players
Reading F.C. players
Southend United F.C. players
Association football midfielders
English Football League players
England youth international footballers
English expatriates in the United States
Expatriate soccer managers in the United States
English women's football managers
Black British sportsmen